Zoltán Czukor (born 18 December 1962 in Komló, Baranya) is a male race walker from Hungary, who competed in three consecutive Summer Olympics for his native country. He still competes in long distance walking races including 24Hr, Antibes 6 days, and the famous Paris-Colmar where he did not finish the 2011 edition.

Achievements

External links
 

1962 births
Living people
Hungarian male racewalkers
Athletes (track and field) at the 2000 Summer Olympics
Athletes (track and field) at the 2004 Summer Olympics
Athletes (track and field) at the 2008 Summer Olympics
Olympic athletes of Hungary
People from Komló
Sportspeople from Baranya County